was a Japanese voice actor from Tokyo. He was formerly attached to Mausu Promotion and  before settling at Arts Vision.

Roles

Television animation
GeGeGe no Kitarō (fourth series) (Grandpa)
GeGeGe no Kitarō (fifth series) (Nichirō)
Heroman (Stan)
Hikaru no Go (Ochi's Grandfather)
Hokuto no Ken 2 (Joseph, Coyote)
Kidō Shinseiki Gundam X (Togusa)
Majime ni Fumajime: Kaiketsu Zorori (Mayor Yagi)
Rurō ni Kenshin: Meiji Kenkaku Romantan (Kōji Rudel)
Saishū Heiki Kanojo (Kawahara)
Soreike! Anpanman (Haioni, High Priest Tenpura)
Soul Eater (Old Man)
Street Fighter II V (Elder)
Yomigaeru Sora – Rescue Wings (Kazuhiko Hirata)

Theatrical animation
Sword of the Stranger (Byakuran)

Video games
Kingdom Hearts Birth by Sleep (Horace Horsecollar, Scrooge McDuck)
Rittai Ninja Katsugeki: Tenchū: Shinobi Gaisen (Yakurō Hikone)
Rittai Ninja Katsugeki: Tenchū 2 (Kishū Gōda)

Dubbing roles

Live action
Ali (Elijah Muhammad)
Armageddon (VHS/DVD edition) (Flight Director Clark (Chris Ellis))
August (David Sterling (Rip Torn))
Clear and Present Danger (John Clark (Willem Dafoe))
Dancer in the Dark (Oldrich Novy)
Dawn of the Dead (Commander)
Donnie Brasco (Dean Blandford (Gerry Becker))
Dragonworld (Angus McGowan) (Andrew Keir)
Ghostbusters (DVD edition) (Archbishop)
In the Line of Fire (DVD edition) (President of the United States)
The Karate Kid (DVD edition) (Mister Miyagi (Pat Morita))
The Karate Kid Part III (DVD edition) (Mister Miyagi (Pat Morita))
Memories of Murder (Sergeant Shin Dong-chul (Song Jae-ho))
Rambo: First Blood Part II (TV Asahi edition) (Captain Vinh)
The Survivor (1983 TV Tokyo edition) (Priest (Joseph Cotten))
Twin Peaks (Pete Martell (Jack Nance))

Animation
Disney's House of Mouse (Horace Horsecollar, White Rabbit, Sheriff of Nottingham)
G.I. Joe: A Real American Hero (Torch)
The Simpsons Movie (Theater edition) (Montgomery Burns)

CD
Clock Tower 2 (Rick)

References

External links
Arts Vision profile

1939 births
2020 deaths
Japanese male voice actors
Male voice actors from Tokyo
20th-century Japanese male actors
21st-century Japanese male actors
Arts Vision voice actors
Mausu Promotion voice actors